Moharam Bek is a neighborhood in Alexandria, Egypt. It is known for the Alexandria Stadium, which sometimes hosts football games.

Gallery

See also 

 Neighborhoods in Alexandria

Populated places in Alexandria Governorate
Neighbourhoods of Alexandria